Stevens Park may refer to:

USA
Stevens Park Estates, Dallas, a neighborhood named for John P. Stevens in the Oak Cliff area of Dallas, Texas
Stevens Park Village, Dallas, a neighborhood named for John P. Stevens in the Oak Cliff area of Dallas, Texas
Stevens Park, Hoboken, a park in Hoboken, New Jersey

United Kingdom
Stevens Park, Quarry Bank, a park in West Midlands, England

See also 
Stevens (disambiguation)